Statewide Insurance Company Limited, commonly referred to as Statewide Insurance Company (SWICO), is an insurance company in Uganda. The company is a leading provider of insurance and risk management services in the country.

Overview
SWICO is one of the licensed insurance companies in the country. Its investments include real estate, the largest of which is Sure House at 1 Bombo Road in Kampala's central business district, which houses SWICO's headquarters.

History
In 1982, Late John Ssebaana Kizito, a Ugandan businessman, economist, and politician, together with a business associate, Joseph W. Kiwanuka, pooled resources and started SWICO. The company is the  oldest privately owned insurance company in Uganda.

Ownership
One of SWICO's shareholders is the founding chairman of the board, John Ssebaana Kizito, who was one of the wealthiest people in Uganda in 2012 according to a published report.

Branch network
The company has a branch network in the following Ugandan locations:

 Main Branch – Sure House, 1 Bombo Road, Kampala 
 Arua Branch – Ouzu Plaza, Adumi Road, Arua
 Entebbe Branch – 33-35 Kampala Road, Entebbe
 Fort Portal Branch – 14 Bwamba Road, Fort Portal
 Gulu Branch – 1 Atwal Road, Gulu
 Hoima Branch – 36 Fort Portal Road, Hoima
 Iganga Branch – 56 Main Street, Iganga
 Jinja Branch – Bemtex Plaza, 68 Main Street, Jinja
 Lira Branch – 26D Kwania Road, Lira
 Masaka Branch – 14 Edward Avenue, Masaka
 Mbale Branch – 4 Manafa Road, Mbale 
 Mbarara Branch – Pride House, 37A High Street, Mbarara
 Mityana Branch – 53B Station Road, Mityana
 Soroti Branch – 4 Cemetery Road, Soroti

Governance
The governing body of the company is the four-member board of directors. John Ssebaana Kizito, one of the founders and one of the shareholders, is the chairman.

Management
The management team comprises twelve managers. Joseph William Kiwanuka, one of the founders and a shareholder, is the managing director, responsible for the daily administration of the company activities.

See also

References

External links
    SWICO Website
  Licensed Insurance Companies In Uganda

Financial services companies established in 1982
1982 establishments in Uganda
Insurance companies of Uganda